Margaret "Minx" T. Fuller is an American developmental biologist known for her research on the male germ line and defining the role of the stem cell environment (the hub cells that establish the niche of particular cells) in specifying cell fate and differentiation.
 
Fuller is the Reed-Hodgson Professor of Human Biology at Stanford University, and former chair of the Stanford Department of Developmental Biology.

Biography
Fuller earned a B.A. in physics from Brandeis University in 1974, and a Ph.D. in microbiology from MIT in 1980, working with Jonathan King. She completed her postdoctoral work in developmental genetics at Indiana University, working with Elizabeth Raff and Thomas Kaufman, from 1980 to 1983,  Fuller joined the University of Colorado faculty and then joined Stanford University in 1990, where she began working on spermatogenesis, doing genetic analysis of microtubule structure and function.

Fuller is married to fellow biologist Matthew P. Scott.

Key papers
 Raff, E.C. and M. T. Fuller, et al., "Regulation of tubulin gene expression during embryogenesis in Drosophila melanogaster", Cell v.28, pp. 33–40 (1982).
 Fuller, M.T. et al., "Genetic Analysis of Microtubule Structure: A b-tubulin Mutation Causes the Formation of Aberrant Microtubule in vivo and in vitro", Journal of Cell Biology, v.104, pp. 385–394 (1987).
 Fuller, M.T. and P.G. Wilson, "Force and Counter Force in the Mitotic Spindle", Cell, v.71, pp. 547–550 (1992).
 Fuller, M.T., "Riding the Polar Winds: Chromosomes Motor Down East," Cell, v.81, pp. 5–8 (1995).
 Hales, K.G., M.T. Fuller, "Developmentally Regulated Mitochondrial Fusion Mediated by a Conserved, Novel, Predicted GTPase", Cell (1997).
 G. J. Hermann, J.W. Thatcher, J.P. Mills, K.G. Hales, M.T. Fuller, "Mitochondrial Fusion in Yeast Requires the Transmembrane GTPase Fzo1p", Journal of Cell Biology (1998).
 Kiger, A., H. White-Cooper, and M.T. fuller, "Somatic support cells restrict germ line stem cell self-renewal and promote differentiation", Nature v.407, pp. 750–754 (2000).

Additional publications
 Margaret T. Fuller and Allan C. Spradling, Review, "Male and Female Drosophila Germline Stem Cells: Two Versions of Immortality", Science, v.316, n.5823, pp. 402–404 (April 20, 2007).

Awards
 1980 - Jane Coffin Childs Fellow
 1985-86 - Searle Scholar
 2004 - Reed-Hodgson Professor, Human Biology, Stanford University
 2006 - Elected member, American Academy of Arts and Sciences
 2008 - Elected member, National Academy of Sciences

References

External links
 Stanford faculty profile
 Fuller Lab page

21st-century American biologists
Stem cell researchers
Living people
Place of birth missing (living people)
Year of birth missing (living people)
Stanford University School of Medicine faculty
Fellows of the American Academy of Arts and Sciences
Developmental biologists
Members of the United States National Academy of Sciences
American women biologists
21st-century American women scientists
20th-century American women scientists
20th-century American biologists
Brandeis University alumni
Massachusetts Institute of Technology School of Science alumni
University of Colorado faculty